Carl Davis (born 1936) is an American-born composer and conductor based in Britain.

Carl Davis may also refer to:
Carl Davis (record producer) (1934–2012), American record producer
Carl Davis (boxer) (born 1973), American cruiserweight and heavyweight boxer
Carl Davis (American football), American football player
Carl Raymond Davis (1911–1940), South African-born flying ace
Carl A. Davis, American football, basketball, and baseball coach

See also
Carl Davis Drumond (born 1975), Costa Rican heavyweight boxer
Carl Davies
Carol Davis (disambiguation)